The Sony Xperia Z2 is an Android-based smartphone unveiled, manufactured, and marketed by Sony and was released in April 2014. Under the codename "Sirius", Xperia Z2 serves as the successor to the Sony Xperia Z1. Like its predecessor, the Xperia Z2 is water and dust proof with an IP rating of IP55 and IP58. The phone features an IPS LED display, a Snapdragon 801 processor and the ability to record 4K videos. The Xperia Z2 also allows removable microSD storage up to 128 GB.

The Xperia Z2 was unveiled alongside the Sony Xperia Z2 Tablet and the Sony Xperia M2 during the 2014 Mobile World Congress in Barcelona, Spain, on February 24, 2014, and was first released in Taiwan on March 24, 2014, in Singapore on April 5, 2014, and entered more markets between April and May 2014. In the United States, the Xperia Z2 was released unlocked through the Sony Store on July 21, 2014.

Many reviewers praised the phone's screen, camera and waterproof design, but criticized its size and camera software issues that cause the device to overheat when recording 4K video for extended periods.

Design

Similar to other devices under the Sony Xperia Z series, the Xperia Z2 has an "Omni-Balance", according to Sony, which is focused on creating balance and symmetry in all directions. The phone comes with the same aluminium frame as its predecessor. It also features tempered glass on the front and back with an aluminium power button placed on the right hand side of the device.

Specifications

Hardware

The Sony Xperia Z2 features a 5.2 inch BRAVIA IPS LCD Triluminos display with a resolution of 1080 by 1920 pixels (Full HD) with a pixel density of 424 ppi. Additionally, display features such as Live Color LED technology reproduces richer colours and more uniform backlighting as compared to the Sony Xperia Z1. It has a large 1/2.3" 20.7 megapixel camera with Sony's in-house G lens with Sony BIONZ for mobile image processor and Exmor RS for mobile image sensor. The camera is capable of HDR and 4K video recording. It also supports 4K video output via MHL 3.0. It also features a front-facing camera of 2.2 megapixels. The phone is available in three different colors, black, purple and white.

The device is equipped with multi-colour LED-backlit stereophonic speakers.

On the inside, the Xperia Z2 features a slightly tweaked Snapdragon 800 processor (known as Snapdragon 801) clocked at 2.3 GHz sealed with a high capacity 3200mAh battery, 3GB of RAM with 16GB (11.57GB user accessible, as shown on the device) internal storage and has microSD, microSDHC, and microSDXC support up to 128GB (note that SD card can be used for app storage under android Lollipop v5.0.2 and later). The Xperia Z2 is lighter and also thinner than its predecessor weighing at 163g and measuring 146.8mm by 73.3mm by 8.2mm. For connectivity, the phone supports NFC, Bluetooth 4.0, DLNA and FM radio. It also supports –DUALSHOCK 4. The ability to connect an external USB device is a feature otherwise known as USB OTG which the Xperia Z2 also supports. Digital noise cancellation technology is also built into the phone which works by using the headsets included with the phone.

Software
The Xperia Z2 originally ran the Android 4.4.2 "KitKat" operating system with Sony's custom launcher and some applications additions, such as Sony's media applications including Walkman (currently updated to Music), Album and Videos. With NFC on the Xperia Z2, it allows 'screen mirroring' — which mirrors what is on the smartphone screen to compatible TVs — and play music over-the-air on NFC-enabled speakers. Screen recording (Screencasting) was implemented in it years ahead of stock Android, and accessible from the power button menu.

The device also includes Sony's battery stamina mode, which extends the phone's standby up to 4 times. Several Google applications (such as Google Chrome, Google Play, Google Search and Voice, Google Maps, and Google Talk) are also preloaded onto the phone. New features added to the software includes 'Smart Backlight' —  which keeps the phone display on for as long as the user is looking at it — and 'Glove Mode'.

The 2160p (4K) video resolution is implemented as separate camera mode in the camera software rather than integrated in the video resolution selector.

Sony announced on their blog that the whole Xperia Z series will be getting the Android 5.0 "Lollipop" update. While the update was planned to be carried out at the start of 2015, the roll-out to the Xperia Z2 did not begin until 7 April 2015. The update in the United Kingdom rolled out on 16 April 2015. The Android 5.1 update was carried out on 21 July 2015.

Sony announced on their blog that the Xperia Z2 will receive the Android 6.0.1 Marshmallow update after the release of Xperia Z5. Subsequently, on 9 April 2016 the update was officially rolled out to the Xperia Z2.

The Xperia Z2 was not among the Sony's list of Xperia models that will be receiving the Android 7.0 Nougat update.

Marketing
In June 2014, the Xperia Z2 was announced as the "official smartphone" of the 2014 FIFA World Cup. In Sweden, customers who purchased the phone also received one of Sony's wearable devices, the Sony SmartBand SWR10.

Variants

All variants support four 2G GSM bands 850/900/1800/1900 and five 3G UMTS band 850/900/1700/1900/2100.

Reception
Like its predecessor, the Sony Xperia Z2 received mostly positive reviews. CNET's reviewer Andrew Hoyle gave the phone a 4.5 stars out of 5, praising its screen, camera and waterproof design. Vlad Savov from The Verge heaped praise on the Xperia Z2's battery life, and the well-built and waterproof design, while criticizing the phone's camera software and its size. John McCann of TechRadar applauded the camera's features, as well as its stylish screen and the battery life, while devoting his criticism towards the phone for being slow at some times, the large bezel design and 4K recording problems. Linus Sebastian of LinusTechTips referred to the Z2 as "Basically the Z1 but with the big glaring issue (The TN panel) gone".

Successor
The successor to the Xperia Z2, the Sony Xperia Z3, was unveiled at IFA 2014 on September 4, 2014.

See also
Sony Xperia Z1
Sony Xperia Z series

References

External links

Android (operating system) devices
Mobile phones introduced in 2014
Digital audio players
Mobile phones with 4K video recording
Discontinued flagship smartphones
Sony smartphones